The 1981 Tennessee Volunteers football team (variously "Tennessee", "UT" or the "Vols") represented the University of Tennessee in the 1981 NCAA Division I-A football season. Playing as a member of the Southeastern Conference (SEC), the team was led by head coach Johnny Majors, in his fifth year, and played their home games at Neyland Stadium in Knoxville, Tennessee. They finished the season with a record of eight wins and four losses (8–4 overall, 3–3 in the SEC). The Volunteers offense scored 244 points while the defense allowed 265 points.

Schedule

Roster

Game summaries

at USC

Team players drafted into the NFL

References:

References

Tennessee
Tennessee Volunteers football seasons
Tennessee Volunteers football